The O'Reilly Theatre is a flexible studio theatre on Blackhall Road, central north Oxford, England. It is located within Keble College, one of the University of Oxford colleges. The theatre was completed in 2002.

Seating capacity of the space ranges from 128 to 200, depending on the setup chosen. The standard configuration is end-on, but alternatives include traverse and in-the-round. The theatre is named after Tony O'Reilly, the billionaire Irish businessman and former international rugby union player, who contributed most of the funds.

The theatre is managed by students at Keble College, and for that reason productions have varied in terms of both style and quality depending on the interest in drama shown in the college and wider university. As of 2007, there is a full management board and slots until the end of the academic year are fully booked.

In terms of size, as compared to other Oxford theatres, the O'Reilly is closest to the OFS Studio in the city centre, although due to its age and the inconsistent quality of productions it does not have as high a standing in the community. However, for a venue of its size, it is unusually well-equipped technically, as may be seen from the theatre manual (available through the Tabs Are For Flying link below).

Shows typically take place on the third, fourth, sixth, and seventh weeks of each Oxford University term. In other weeks the theatre is rented out as a conference centre.

External links 
 O'Reilly Theatre website
  O'Reilly Theatre — Keble
  O'Reilly Venue Guide (from TAFF)

Theatres completed in 2002
Theatres in Oxford
Keble College, Oxford
Student theatre in the United Kingdom
Tony O'Reilly family
Studio theatres in Oxford
University and college theatres in Oxford
Buildings and structures of the University of Oxford
2002 establishments in England